Loudon is both a surname and a given name. Notable people with the name include:

Surname:
Alex Loudon (born 1980), English cricketer
Chris Loudon (born 1985), Scottish darts player
Dave Loudon (born 1954), Scottish cricketer
Dorothy Loudon (1933–2003), Broadway actress
Ernst Gideon Freiherr von Laudon, often written as Loudon (1717–1790), Austrian general
Harald von Loudon (1876–1959), Baltic-German ornithologist
Irvine Loudon (1924–2015), British doctor, medical historian and artist
James Loudon (1841–1916), Canadian professor of physics
James Loudon (politician) (1824–1900), Dutch politician, governor of Dutch East Indies
Jane Loudon (née Webb, 1807–1858), English novelist and horticulturist
Johann Ludwig Alexius von Loudon (1767–1822), Austrian general
John Claudius Loudon (1783–1843), Scottish botanist
John Loudon (minister) (1866–1955), Dutch politician and statesman
John Hugo Loudon (1905–1996), Dutch CEO of Royal Dutch Shell, and president of the WWF
John William Loudon (born 1967), Missouri state senator
Peter Loudon (born 1966), Scottish curler
Thomas Loudon (1883–1968), Canadian rower
Trevor Loudon, New Zealand political activist
William James Loudon (1860–1951), Canadian geologist and photographer

Given name:
Loudon Wainwright, Jr. (1924–1988), American writer
Loudon Wainwright III (born 1946), American musician
William Loudon Mollison (1851–1929), Scottish mathematician and academic

See also
Louden (disambiguation)
Loudin